Rachelle Cruz is an American poet. She won a  2018 American Book Award.

She teaches at University of California, Riverside. In 2019, she was  Inlandia Literary Laureate.

Works 

 God’s Will for Monsters (Inlandia, 2017)

References 

University of California, Riverside faculty
Living people
American women poets
Year of birth missing (living people)
21st-century American women